The First Federal Electoral District of the Federal District (I Distrito Electoral Federal del Distrito Federal) is one of the 300 Electoral Districts into which Mexico is divided for the purpose of elections to the federal Chamber of Deputies and one of 27 such districts in the Federal District ("DF" or Mexico City).

It elects one deputy to the lower house of Congress for each three-year legislative period, by means of the first past the post system.

District territory
Under the 2005 districting scheme, the DF's First District covers the northern portion of the borough (delegación) of Gustavo A. Madero. This makes it the northernmost federal electoral district in the DF.

Previous districting schemes

1996–2005 district
Between 1996 and 2005, the First District had practically the same composition as at present.

Deputies returned to Congress from this district

L Legislature
 1976–1979: Eduardo Andrade Sánchez (PRI)
LI Legislature
 1979–1982: Carlos Duffo López (PRI)
LII Legislature
 1982–1985: Pedro Luis Bartilotti Perea (PRI)
LIII Legislature
 1985–1988: Manuel Gurría Ordóñez (PRI)
LIV Legislature
 1988–1991: Jaime Guillermo Aviña Zepeda (PAN)
LV Legislature
 1991–1994:
LVI Legislature
 1994–1997: Manuel Arciniega Portillo (PAN)
LVII Legislature
 1997–2000: César Lonche Castellanos (PRD)
LVIII Legislature
 2000–2003: Julieta Prieto Furhken (PVEM)
LIX Legislature
 2003–2006: Marcos Morales Torres (PRD)
LX Legislature
 2006–2009: Andrés Lozano Lozano (PRD)

References 

Federal electoral districts of Mexico
Mexico City